Walkie Bits are little plastic toy turtles that sing, dance and walk (they can walk in the rhythm which you tap on their shell). They are made by Takara, a Japanese toy company in June 2005. Walkie Bits are very small, only about five centimeters, and come in a variety of different colors and "flavors" like "blue soda" and "green pineapple".

The Walkie Bits turtles are very popular in Japan, with 300,000 units sold within just a few months of their release. Many Japanese people collect them because there are so many colors and they are relatively inexpensive. What also makes them so appealing is that you can remove the turtle's "shell" and swap it out with a different turtle's shell. It is also very popular and common to decorate the turtles' shells with stickers, stick-on jewels and even nail polish. The Walkie Bits turtles even had a segment on Japan's Morning Musume show, where the girls raced, played and decorated their turtles. To collaborate with the release of Gamera The Brave (2006), a Walkie Bits Gamera was made.

Time named Walkie Bits one of the best inventions of 2005.

References

2000s toys
Electronic toys
Toy animals